The National Sports Week (abbreviated as PON) is a multi-sport event held every four years in Indonesia. The participants of this event are the athletes from all provinces of Indonesia. It is organized by the National Sports Committee of Indonesia (KONI).

History 
The Indonesian Sports Association (ISI) was established in Jakarta in 1938 with the aim of coordinating the existing sports associations including the Football Federation. During the Japanese occupation of Indonesia from 1942 to 1945, sporting activities were coordinated by the Sports Practice Movement. Following the Indonesian Declaration of Independence in 1945, that nation took over the running of its own sport and in January 1946, a conference was held in Solo, Central Java, which gave rise to the Indonesian Olympic Committee (KORI), chaired by Sultan Hamengkubuwono IX.

Indonesia was unable to participate in the 1948 Olympic Games because Indonesian independence had not been recognized, and Indonesia was not a member of the International Olympic Committee. At an emergency conference in Solo on 1 May 1948 to discuss Indonesia's failure to compete in the Olympics, it was decided to organize the first National Games, which ran from 8–12 September 1948.

During the first Pekan Olahraga Nasional event, many sporting organizations tested a uniform system which is to be recognized throughout the country as the official scoring method. Until then, no clear rules were evident. In the case of the Aurora Club, Bandung, later to be renamed into Health and Strength organization, a scoring system went into trial for the weightlifting event; in which Carl Sugianto was crowned as the first weightlifting champion of Indonesia.

List of National Sports Week 

1 cancelled because of the 30 September Movement
2 originally 20 October–2 November 2020, postponed because of COVID-19 pandemic

List of champions
Jakarta has become the province with the most overall championship titles in PON which has been held since 1948 in Surakarta.

1 Overall champion as Surakarta Residency

PON Remaja (National Youth Sports Week)
In September 2010, Indonesian Minister of Youth and Sport Affairs, Andi Mallarangeng, decided to create a youth version of Pekan Olahraga Nasional. Concerns due to failure of Indonesian contingent in the 2010 Youth Olympics was the background of the event's creation. The first PON Remaja was originally scheduled for 2013, but it was moved to 2014 due to financial problems.

Editions

Pekan Paralimpik Nasional (National Paralympic Week)

The National Paralympic Week, abbreviated as Peparnas, is multi-sport event for Indonesian athletes with disabilities. It was known as Pekan Olahraga Cacat Nasional (Porcanas) until 2008 edition and held separately with PON until 2004.

Editions

References

 Kompas newspaper, pp, 1,10, 6 July 2008

 
Multi-sport events in Indonesia
Indonesia